eTown is a 501c3 non-profit broadcast organization. Based in Boulder, Colorado, eTown is a nationally syndicated multimedia, podcasting and events production company. The eTown radio broadcast can be heard on National Public Radio, community radio stations, and commercial radio. The program has a variety show formats featuring live musical performances, interviews with musicians, authors, and other public figures.  

eTown is recorded in front of a live audience at eTown Hall, a solar-powered theater in Boulder, CO, which also serves as a social hub for community events. eTown also records eTown on the Road which are taped on location in various cities across the country. The program and podcasts can be heard on over 300 radio stations across the U.S. and around the world.  

Since 1991, eTown has coupled music and entertainment with information and interviews about environmental and social issues like global warming, environmental justice, the viability of alternative energy and the importance of conservation and environmental stewardship. eTown’s listener-nominated segment, the eChievement Award, highlights stories of individuals working to make a positive difference in their communities and beyond.

Background

eTown was founded in 1991 by host Nick Forster and his wife, Helen Forster who serves as co-host and executive producer of the show. eTown presents a wide range of roots music, conversation and examples of environmental and community activism to listeners around the world.

eTown host Nick Forster's involvement in music began as a teen playing guitar in various amateur folk and folk-rock bands in upstate New York. A job offer as a luthier (guitar repairman) led him to Colorado in 1975, where he met future band mates Charles Sawtelle, Pete Wernick and Tim O'Brien. In 1978 they formed the bluegrass group: Hot Rize. In Hot Rize, Nick played the bass and guitar, provided vocals and acted as the group's M.C. The band released ten albums, toured worldwide and appeared on radio and television programs, including Austin City Limits, The Grand Ole Opry and A Prairie Home Companion. Hot Rize earned both a Grammy nomination and the International Bluegrass Music Association's Entertainer of the Year Award before retiring in the spring of 1990. Nick teamed up with Tim O’Brien and Jerry Douglas to form a new group just after Hot Rize retired. In 1990, Nick accompanied Sam Bush, John Cowan, and Laurie Lewis on an extensive US State Department tour of Eastern Europe and Turkey. During the tour, he was struck by music's ability to bring people from diverse backgrounds together, including former Communist Party bosses, new democratic leaders, schoolteachers, business executives, dissident poets and everyday citizens. He was also astounded by the region's noticeable environmental degradation due to lack of community control. Nick imagined there had to be a way to link the power of music with the sharing of information about and solutions to the environmental and social challenges facing the planet, inspiring people to work together to make a positive difference. On the flight home, he came up with the idea of a radio program that would channel the energy and spirit of live-performance audiences into a dialogue about global issues. Returning home from that U.S. State Department tour, Nick shared the idea of the radio show with Helen, who agreed to help him. The two of them launched the program ‘eTown’ on Earth Day in 1991.

eTown’s co-host Helen Forster began her artistic career as a child studying and performing theater and music in Minneapolis. She attended the University of Minnesota, where a chance enrollment in one of its first environmental studies courses made a huge impact on her, one that would establish an environmental awareness within her that would eventually guide her involvement in eTown. After college, Helen moved to Telluride, Colorado, where she joined two theater companies: SRO, an improvisational comedy troupe loosely modeled on Second City Chicago, and Plunge Players, a formal theater company led by L.A. director Paul Fagan. During this period, in addition to her role as a professional theater actress and as a writer/performer in SRO, she also performed in multiple radio theater productions, co-authored three children's musicals and honed her skills musically as a professional vocalist. Additionally, Helen developed broad production experience as producer and director of numerous stage productions and live "on-the-air" radio theater pieces. For several years, she also owned and produced the Telluride Bluegrass Festival, an annual music festival with international acclaim. (It was behind the stage during that festival in the late 1980s that Nick and Helen first met, eventually marrying in 1991.) Outside of her current day role in eTown, Helen has performed as a vocalist on Prairie Home Companion and in concerts around the country. She is also a nationally established voice-over talent.

Format
eTown's broadcasts include a mixture of musicians who perform for the show’s live audience in a variety show format. Two artists typically appear on the show each week. These musical performances are interspersed with informal interviews with show host Nick Forster. These conversations explore each artist's roots and influences, as well as their interests in social and environmental causes. eTown broadcasts also include the show’s flagship eChievement Award segment, where individuals are showcased for their work on behalf of the greater good. These are people who have identified an environmental or social issue at the community, national or global level and whose efforts are effectively addressing the resulting need. Some of the shows also include an additional interview segment, featuring discussions with a variety of different authors, activists, scientists and policymakers about a range of social and environmental issues and their possible solutions.

Performers
Since its inception in 1991, more than one thousand visiting and local artists have performed for the eTown audience. The program's guest artists have included artists such as Aaron Neville Quintet, David Gray, James Taylor, Michael Franti & Spearhead, Loretta Lynn, Ray LaMontagne, The Fray, Ralph Stanley, The Blind Boys of Alabama, Bruce Cockburn, Barenaked Ladies, Ingrid Michaelson, Koko Taylor,  David Crosby & Graham Nash, Ani DiFranco, Pops Staples, Randy Newman, Dr. John, Joe Jackson, Sarah McLachlan, Los Lobos, The Fairfield Four, Bruce Hornsby, Bill Frisell, Shawn Colvin, Lyle Lovett, Buddy Guy, Jack Johnson, Odetta, Ben Harper, Richard Thompson, Wanda Jackson, Rickie Lee Jones, Keb' Mo', Spoon, Ladysmith Black Mambazo, Del McCoury, Taj Mahal, Emmylou Harris, Willie Nelson, Nickel Creek, Pinetop Perkins, Béla Fleck,  Earl Scruggs, Glen Hansard, Kenny Wayne Shepherd, The Flatlanders,  Townes Van Zandt, Patty Griffin, Charlie Musselwhite, Doc Watson, James McMurtry and hundreds more.

eTones

The eTown house band, the eTones, perform throughout various segments of the program, and often with the visiting artists featured on the show. Ron Jolly (keyboards), Christian Teele (drums), Chris Engleman (bass), and Helen Forster (harmony vocals) join Nick Forster (guitars/mandolin) as eTown’s resident musicians.

Guests
In addition to the various musical guests, some of the eTown interviewees have included such guests as Dr. Jane Goodall, Vice President Al Gore, Poets Jack Collom and Allen Ginsberg, humorist Dave Barry, environmental advocate Bobby Kennedy Jr., President Jimmy Carter, Michael Moore, poet Terry Tempest Williams, Professor Bryan Willson, cowboy poet Baxter Black, Nobel Prize–winning economist Paul Krugman, actor/environmentalist Ed Begley, Jr., Senator George McGovern, Pete Seeger, activist Julia Butterfly Hill, climber/author Erik Weihenmayer, and columnist/reporter Amy Goodman.

eTown Hall

In 2012, eTown celebrated its 21st anniversary and moved into the renovated eTown Hall building, its new permanent home. Purchased by the organization in 2008, this 1925 former church (located at 16th and Spruce Streets, right in the heart of downtown Boulder, Colorado) was converted into a performance hall, recording and production studios, eTown offices, and shared community space. The Denver Post wrote, "The completed eTown Hall will generate more than half of its own power with solar panels and an experimental heating and cooling system."

eTown Hall is located at 1535 Spruce St. in downtown Boulder, Colorado 80302.

References

Mass media in Boulder, Colorado
NPR programs
Culture of Boulder, Colorado
1991 in radio
1991 establishments in Colorado
1991 radio programme debuts